Premont may refer to
Premont, Texas, a city in the Jim Wells County, Texas
Prémont, a French commune in the Aisne department